Cavanakill is a townland of 1,473 acres in County Armagh, Northern Ireland. It is situated in the civil parish of Ballymyre and the historic barony of Fews Upper.

See also
List of townlands in County Armagh

References

Townlands of County Armagh
Civil parish of Ballymyre